Hunan Billows Football Club is a professional Chinese football club that participates in the China League Two division under licence from the Chinese Football Association (CFA). The team is based in Changsha, Hunan and their home stadium is the 30,000-seat Yiyang Stadium. Their majority shareholders are the Hunan Provincial Sports Bureau and high-tech industry company Hunan Corun New Energy Co. Ltd.

The club was founded on December 26, 2006, and won the 2009 Chinese League Two title and promotion to the Chinese League One division, but was relegated back after the 2016 season.

History

Formation
To preserve the representation of Hunan province in the Chinese football league pyramid after the dissolution of Hunan Shoking, the local Hunan Provincial Sports Bureau decided that it would be best to invest in a new team for the area. On December 26, 2006, a new team was formed to participate in the 2007 league season called Hunan Billows F.C. with Xiong Ni returning as their chairman and Li Kejia returning as their manager. Now playing within the 6,000-seat Hunan Provincial People's Stadium. The team was completely rebuilt and played their first league game against Sichuan FC in a 1–0 defeat. Throughout the season the club's results improved and the team finished third in the Southern division. They made the play-offs but were knocked out in the second round. With a further investment of six million Yuan from the local Hunan government sports body, in the following season results the club gained another play-off position. Again they were knocked out in the second round. By the 2009 league season and with the continued investment of the local Hunan government sports body and of the management of Men Wenfeng, the club won the division title after they beat local rivals Hubei Luyin in the playoff final to win the division title.
In the second tier again, they moved back into the Helong Stadium and hired Zhao Faqing as their new manager at the beginning of the 2010 league season. The season began well for the club and they looked like genuine promotion contenders. Conflicts between the Hunan and the Hubei Greenery fans during their May 14 game seemed to derail their promotion push. They finished the season in sixth. The next season they moved into the 20,000-seat Central South University Stadium and brought in Miloš Hrstić to manage them. Miloš Hrstić's leadership improved the team's ranking at the end of the 2011 league season slightly – they finished fourth. He left the club at the end of the season and was replaced by his assistant coach Zhang Xu. In preparation for the 2012 league season the club brought in several high profile players such as Honduras internationals Emil Martínez and Erick Norales and Chinese international Dong Fangzhuo in their hopes to win promotion. The recruitment for not result in promotion that season, but it brought an increase in investment in from the Hunan Liuyang River Wine Winery Industry Co., Ltd., Zoomlion Company Limited, Central South Publishing & Media Group Co., Ltd., Kelme and the return of Hunan Corun New Energy co. ltd.

Hunan declined in the mid 2010s and were relegated back to League Two in 2016.

Grounds
The team have played in several stadiums throughout their history. When they were formed they predominantly
used the 55,000-seat Helong Stadium in Changsha for their important matches. The more modest 6,000-seat Hunan Provincial People's Stadium which is also located in Changsha was used for their smaller games. With the club in financial difficulties the cost of renting the Helong Stadium led the team to move permanently into the Hunan Provincial People's Stadium.  They started there when the club was reformed and they were playing in the third tier. When they won promotion back into the second tier, the Helong Stadium was an option for a brief period before 2011 when they have predominantly used the 20,000-seat Central South University Stadium in Changsha as their main stadium.

Players

Current squad

Coaching staff

Managerial history

  Li Kejia 26 December 2006 – 2008
  Men Wenfeng 2009
  Zhao Faqing 2009–19 December 2009
  Miloš Hrstić 19 December 2009 – 1 November 2011
  Zhang Xu 1 November 2011 – 11 December 2012
  Dražen Besek 11 December 2012 – 25 July 2013
  Huang Cheng (Caretaker) 25 July 2013 – 27 November 2014
  Aleksandar Stankov 27 November 2014 – 2 May 2015
  Zhang Xu (caretaker) 2 May 2015 – 6 August 2015
  Žikica Tasevski 6 August 2015 – 1 November 2015
  Tomaž Kavčič 30 November 2015–28 May 2016
  Huang Xiangdong (caretaker) 28 May 2016 – 31 December 2016
  Zhang Xu 1 January 2017 – 27 May 2017
  Vladimir Slišković 3 February 2017 – 26 August 2017
  Li Hongwu (caretaker) 27 May 2017 – 23 June 2017
  Patrick de Wilde 23 June 2017 – 5 December 2017
  Pei Encai 22 February 2018 – 7 July 2018
  Sun Wei 7 July 2018 – 25 February 2019
  Tang Jing 25 February 2019 – 2 June 2020
  Wang Chen 2 June 2020 – 31 December 2020
  Jia Hong 1 January 2021 –

Results
All-time league rankings

As of the end of 2019 season.

 In group stage.

Key
 Pld = Played
 W = Games won
 D = Games drawn
 L = Games lost
 F = Goals for
 A = Goals against
 Pts = Points
 Pos = Final position

 DNQ = Did not qualify
 DNE = Did not enter
 NH = Not Held
 – = Does Not Exist
 R1 = Round 1
 R2 = Round 2
 R3 = Round 3
 R4 = Round 4

 F = Final
 SF = Semi-finals
 QF = Quarter-finals
 R16 = Round of 16
 Group = Group stage
 GS2 = Second Group stage
 QR1 = First Qualifying Round
 QR2 = Second Qualifying Round
 QR3 = Third Qualifying Round

Honours
 China League Two (Third Tier League)
Winners (1) : 2009

References

External links
Official club website 

Football clubs in China
Sport in Hunan
Association football clubs established in 2006
2006 establishments in China